Robert Faulcon may refer to:

a pseudonym of science-fiction writer Robert Holdstock
Robert Faulcon, Jr., police officer convicted in the Danziger Bridge shootings

See also
Robert Falcon, musician with Revealed Recordings
Robert Falconer (1867–1943), Canadian academic and bible scholar.